The Sexual Offences Act 2003 (c. 42) is an Act of the Parliament of the United Kingdom.

It partly replaced the Sexual Offences Act 1956 with more specific and explicit wording. It also created several new offences such as non-consensual voyeurism, assault by penetration, causing a child to watch a sexual act, and penetration of any part of a corpse. It defines and sets legal guidelines for rape in English law. It is also the main legislation dealing with child sexual abuse.

The corresponding legislation in Scotland is the Sexual Offences (Scotland) Act 2009 and in Northern Ireland the Sexual Offences (Northern Ireland) Order 2008.

Major changes
Part I of the Act makes many changes to the sexual crimes laws in England and Wales (and to some extent Northern Ireland), almost completely replacing the Sexual Offences Act 1956.

Rape
Rape has been redefined from the Sexual Offences Act 1956 (amended in 1976 and 1994) to read:
A person (A) commits an offence if—

(a) he intentionally penetrates the vagina, anus or mouth of another person (B) with his penis,

(b) B does not consent to the penetration, and

(c) A does not reasonably believe that B consents.

Rape previously did not include penetration of the mouth. The Act also changes the way in which lack of consent may be proved, and section 75 and 76 of the Act list circumstances in which lack of consent may be presumed.

Assault by penetration
Section 2 creates the offence of Assault by penetration. This offence is set out separately because rape is defined as requiring penile penetration. Therefore, non-consensual sexual penetration of the vagina or anus with either another part of the body (such as the fingers), or an object, must be prosecuted under this section. Section 2 closely mirrors section 1's definition of rape, including the same maximum sentence (life imprisonment), but does not include penetration of the mouth, and carries the additional requirement that "the penetration is sexual", i.e. performed for the purpose of either the offender's sexual gratification or the victim's sexual humiliation.

Consent
The Act made significant changes to the legal definition of consent.

Sections 64 and 65 relate to sexual relationships within the family. Section 64 prohibits penetrating any other family member, and section 65 prohibits consenting to such sexual activities. Initially the legislation did not include uncles, aunts, nieces and nephews but after some debate these were written into the provision.

Section 74 states that: "For the purposes of this Part, a person consents if he agrees by choice, and has the freedom and capacity to make that choice."

Section 75 
Section 75 of the Act introduced a number of evidential presumptions, which prove lack of consent unless the defence can provide sufficient, contrary evidence that the claimant did consent. These presumptions require the relevant act to have taken place at the same time as one of six circumstances existed, about which the defendant was aware.

The circumstances are (summarised):

a) violence was used or threatened to be used against the complainant, during or immediately before the act

b) violence was used or threatened to be used against another person, during or immediately before the act

c) claimant was unlawfully detained

d) claimant was asleep/unconscious

e) claimant had a physical disability which prevented them from communicating consent

f) claimant was able to be overpowered/ subdued by a substance administered to them against their will

Section 76 
Section 76 of the Act introduces two conclusive presumptions. These are:

a) where the defendant deceives the victim to the nature or purpose of the relevant act (i.e. fraud)

b) where the defendant induces the victim to consent by impersonating someone known to the complainant.

When either is proven, the law states that it is conclusively presumed that the complainant did not consent to the act, and the defendant was aware of the lack of consent. This cannot be rebutted by any contrary evidence, as is possible with section 75.

Dual criminality 
Section 72 provides differing levels of dual criminality for specified offences according to the UK citizenship status of an offender. For UK nationals, acts outside the UK that would amount to an offence in the UK can be prosecuted as if they had been done in the UK, regardless of whether the acts are lawful where they were done. For UK residents, acts outside the United Kingdom have to constitute an offence in the country where they are committed, in order to be prosecuted in Britain.

Other provisions 

The Act also now includes provisions against sex tourism. People who travel abroad with the intent to commit sexual offences can have their passports revoked or travel restricted. 

Group homosexual sex has been decriminalised, in that Schedule 6 of the 2003 Act caused section 12 of the Sexual Offences Act 1956 to be omitted, removing the offence of homosexual sex "when more than two persons take part or are present".

Part II of the Act also consolidated the provisions of the Sex Offenders Act 1997 on registration of sex offenders and protective orders. These provisions generally apply throughout the United Kingdom.

Section 45(2) changed the definition of "child" in the Protection of Children Act 1978 (which applies to child pornography) from a person under 16 to a person under 18. Section 45 also inserted section 1A of the 1978 Act, and section 160A of the Criminal Justice Act 1988, which create defences which apply where the photograph showed the child alone or with the defendant (but not if it showed any other person), the defendant proves that the photograph was of the child aged 16 or over and that he and the child were married or lived together as partners in an enduring family relationship, and certain other conditions are met.

The Sexual Offences Act 2003 creates further offences relating to prostitution.
Sections 47 to 50 prohibit child prostitution.
Sections 52 and 53 prohibit pimping for financial gain.
Sections 57 to 59 create offences relating to sex trafficking.
The Act also inserted a new section 33A into the Sexual Offences Act 1956, which relates to brothels.
A new section 51A was inserted by the Policing and Crime Act 2009, which prohibits soliciting. This came into effect on 1 April 2010.

Criticisms 
The Act has faced criticism on several grounds.

Consent
The definition of consent (criminal law) has caused some academics to raise concerns about the way consent is interpreted. Bethany Simpson has suggested the terms "freedom" and "choice" used to define consent are too complex for the courts to apply.

Underage persons
One of the more controversial parts of the Act involves the criminalising of various common behaviours, such as laws which, on the face of it, outlaw consensual "sexual hugging" in public places or by underage persons, even when both participants are under age, followed by the issue of guidance notes which countermand this, saying they should almost never be prosecuted.

The Home Office stated that legalising consensual sexual activity between children "would damage a fundamental plank in our raft of child protection measures.". A spokesman said, "We are not prepared to do this. We accept that genuinely mutually agreed, non-exploitative sexual activity between teenagers does take place and in many instances no harm comes from it. We are putting safeguards in place to ensure that these cases, which are not in the public interest, are not prosecuted – by amending guidance to the police and Crown Prosecution Service."

Criticism came from Action on Rights for Children: "Laws should mean what they say. It's astonishing that the government could consider legislation with the prior intent of issuing guidance to countermand it. I worry about the message it sends to young people – it seems to say that sometimes the law means what it says and sometimes it doesn't."

Professor Nicola Lacey of the London School of Economics commented: "What the Home Office would say was that they wanted to use the criminal law for symbolic impact, to say that it's not a good thing for kids to be having sex. My counter-argument is that the criminal law is too dangerous a tool to be used for symbolic purposes. With this on the statute book, it will give police and prosecutors a lot of discretion. It could be used as a way of controlling kids who perhaps the police want to control for other reasons. Kids who perhaps are a nuisance or who belong to a group who attract the attention of the police in some way."

Lack of transitional provisions

The 2003 Act repealed most sections of the Sexual Offences Act 1956 and several other statutes dealing with sexual offences. Section 141 of the Act gave the Home Secretary the power to make rules by statutory instrument to deal with the transition from the old to the new laws, to cover the situation where a defendant is charged with offences which overlap the commencement date of 1 May 2004. However no such "transitional provisions" were ever made.

This resulted in cases where a defendant was accused of committing a sexual offence but the prosecution could not prove the exact date of the offence, which could have been committed either before or after 1 May 2004. In these cases, the defendant had to be found not guilty, regardless of how strong the evidence against them was because a sexual offence committed before 1 May was an offence under the old law, but an offence committed on or after that date was a different offence under the new law. For example, an assault might either be indecent assault under the 1956 Act, or the new offence of sexual assault under the 2003 Act, depending on when it happened, but it could not be both. If the prosecution could not prove beyond reasonable doubt which offence had been committed, then the defendant could not be convicted of either.

The Court of Appeal first dealt with this problem in December 2005, when the prosecution appealed against the decision of a judge to order a jury to acquit a defendant for precisely that reason. Dismissing the appeal, Lord Justice Rose said: "If a history of criminal legislation ever comes to be written it is unlikely that 2003 will be identified as a year of exemplary skill in the annals of Parliamentary drafting."

This situation was not resolved until Parliament passed section 55 of the Violent Crime Reduction Act 2006, which came into force in February 2007.

Extent and repeals
The Act applies to England and Wales only, except for the provisions listed in s.142(2) of the Act which also apply to Northern Ireland and the provisions listed in s.142(3) of the Act which also apply to Scotland. The Act repealed the Sex Offenders Act 1997 in its entirety, and almost all of the Sexual Offences Act 1956, which until then had been the main legislation for sexual offences. It also repealed much of the Sexual Offences Act 1967 which had discriminated heavily against homosexual and bisexual men, leaving it largely gutted of statutory effect.

Amendments
The Voyeurism (Offences) Act 2019 amended the Sexual Offences Act 2003 to make upskirting a specific offence in England and Wales.

See also
Sexual Offences Act
Sexual offences in the United Kingdom
Violent and Sex Offender Register
Optional Protocol to the Convention on the Rights of the Child on the Sale of Children, Child Prostitution and Child Pornography
Operation Cathedral

Notes

References
Kim Stevenson, Anne Davies, and Michael Gunn, Blackstone's Guide to the Sexual Offences Act 2003 (OUP 2003)
Guidance on part 2 of the Sexual Offences Act 2003

External links

Sexual Offences Act 2003 at legislation.gov.uk
"Teenage kissing: The new sex crime?" by Giles Wilson, BBC, 30 April 2004

English criminal law
Sex crimes in the United Kingdom
United Kingdom Acts of Parliament 2003
Sexuality in the United Kingdom
Prostitution law in the United Kingdom